Union is a city in and the county seat of Franklin County, Missouri, United States. The population was 10,204 at the 2010 census, with the city showing the highest growth rate (32%) in Franklin County over the previous decade.

History
Union was founded in 1826 and designated as the county seat in 1827. The city is named for the ideal of political unity.  A post office called Union has been in operation since 1827.

Early German settlers established themselves in and around Franklin County, including what would later be known as Union. German architecture, culture, and especially surnames are still prevalent around Union and surrounding areas.  Depending on the definition, the city is within or near a region known as the Missouri Rhineland.

Geography
The city is located on the northwest side of the Bourbeuse River. US Route 50 passes through the city and I-44 is approximately five miles to the east. Washington, on the Missouri River, is seven miles to the north on Missouri Route 47.

Demographics

2010 census
As of the census of 2010, there were 10,204 people, 3,902 households, and 2,612 families living in the city. The racial makeup of the city was 95.7% White, 1.1% African American, 0.6% Native American, 0.4% Asian, 0.5% from other races, and 1.6% from two or more races. Hispanic or Latino of any race were 1.4% of the population.

There were 3,902 households, of which 39.1% had children under the age of 18 living with them, 47.7% were married couples living together, 13.1% had a female householder with no husband present, 6.1% had a male householder with no wife present, and 33.1% were non-families. 27.1% of all households were made up of individuals, and 10.8% had someone living alone who was 65 years of age or older. The average household size was 2.59 and the average family size was 3.14.

The median age in the city was 31.9 years. 28.2% of residents were under the age of 18; 9.9% were between the ages of 18 and 24; 29.1% were from 25 to 44; 21.4% were from 45 to 64; and 11.5% were 65 years of age or older. The gender makeup of the city was 48.3% male and 51.7% female.

2000 census
As of the 2000 United States Census, there were 7,757 people, 2,940 households, and 2,002 families living in the city. The racial makeup of the city was 96.44% White, 1.43% African American, 0.30% Native American, 0.17% Asian, 0.23% from other races, and 1.43% from two or more races. Hispanic or Latino of any race were 0.99% of the population.

There were 2,940 households, out of which 35.7% had children under the age of 18 living with them, 52.7% were married couples living together, 11.5% had a female householder with no husband present, and 31.9% were non-families. 26.8% of all households were made up of individuals, and 11.1% had someone living alone who was 65 years of age or older. The average household size was 2.56 and the average family size was 3.10.

The median income for a household in the city was $39,596, and the median income for a family was $44,474. Males had a median income of $31,852 versus $22,924 for females. The per capita income for the city was $16,885. About 4.2% of families and 7.2% of the population were below the poverty line, including 4.8% of those under age 18 and 11.2% of those age 65 or over.

Government
The City of Union is a 4th Class City with a City Administrator form of government.  The elected, policy-making body of the City consists of a Mayor and an eight-member Board of Aldermen. Union is divided into four wards and each ward has two aldermanic representatives. Municipal elections are held on the first Tuesday of April every year.

The City Administrator Russell Rost is appointed by the Board of Aldermen and is the full-time Administrative Officer of the City responsible for overseeing all daily operations and the municipal staff.  The current Mayor of Union is Mayor Rodney J. Tappe. The city is divided into four wards. Two Aldermen are elected from each ward and sit on the Board of Aldermen.

Transportation

Rail 
Central Midland Railway (CMR), a division of Progressive Rail Inc. of Minnesota, provides regular freight rail service to industrial customers located in Union.  CMR operates the far eastern segment of the former Chicago, Rock Island and Pacific Railway's St. Louis to Kansas City main line that was constructed in 1870. The active portion of the former CRI&P line runs from the north side of St. Louis, where it connects with the Terminal Railroad Association of St. Louis and Union Pacific Railroad, and now terminates in Union, Missouri.

Education
The only public secondary school is Union High School (The UHS Wildcats), which enrolls ninth through twelfth grades. There is one public middle school (The UMS Wildcats) serving sixth through eighth grades, and two public elementary schools (Central Elementary and Prairie Dell Elementary, also the Wildcats) with both serving kindergarten through fifth grades. Union also has one private Catholic school, Immaculate Conception (Serving Pre-K to eighth grade). 

Union is home to East Central College, which offers two-year degrees and certificates. Central Methodist University has an extension on the ECC campus. Union is also home to an extension  of Missouri Baptist University.

Union has a public library, a branch of the Scenic Regional Library System.

Economy

The Missouri Meerschaum company, founded in 1869 is the first and oldest manufacturer of corn-cob pipes. With the introduction of the railroad in the late 1800’s, Union saw an increase in population which in turn, increased the need for job opportunities. In 1907, The National Cob Pipe Works was opened to help fulfill the need for jobs in the area. In less than 10 years, it became one of the largest corn cob pipe manufacturers in the world, producing at least five million cob pipes a year. By 1925, there were almost a dozen corn cob pipes spread across Franklin County. The only surviving corn cob pipe factory left is the original Missouri Meerschaum Company located in Washington, Missouri.

Presently, there are over 300 businesses in Union, including the presence of manufacturers such as the Esselte Pendaflex Corporation and Silgan Plastic Containers.

Notable people 

 Paul J. Mueller (1892–1964), United States Army personnel 
 William L. Nicholson (1926–2020), United States Air Force general
 Kenneth Roderick O'Neal (1908–1989), architect, born in Union

See also

 List of cities in Missouri

References

External links

 
 Union Area Chamber of Commerce
 "Historic maps of Union", Sanborn Maps of Missouri Collection, University of Missouri

Cities in Franklin County, Missouri
Cities in Missouri
County seats in Missouri